Cirrhicera cinereola is a species of beetle in the family Cerambycidae. It was described by Bates in 1881. It is known from Mexico and Costa Rica.

References

Hemilophini
Beetles described in 1881